Unga Group Limited is a Kenyan-based holding company with its investments in the business of flour milling and manufacturing of human nutrition products and animal feeds. The group has operations in Kenya and Uganda.

Overview 
Unga Group was founded in 1908 making it one of Kenya's oldest companies. The group's headquarters are in Nairobi with flour mills in Eldoret, Nakuru and Mombasa.

In 2000, Unga Group was in losses and entered into a strategic investment partnership with Seaboard Corporation to form Unga Holding Limited as part of its recovery strategy. Unga Groups operations were all transferred to the newly created subsidiary. Seaboard Corporation brought on-board capital and technical expertise.

Unga Group re-entered the bread market in 2015 through its acquisition of Ennsvalley Bakery. This move was aimed to diversify the group's investments. This acquisition was funded by the proceeds the group earned from the sale its 51% stake in Bullpak, the group's paper packaging subsidiary, to South African based Nampak.

Member companies 
The companies that compose Unga Group include and are not limited to:
 Unga Investments Limited – 100% Shareholding – This is the group's investment holding company.
 Unga Holdings Limited – 65% Shareholding – Held through Unga Investments Limited. This is the holding company of all of the group's operating subsidiaries.
 Unga Limited – Nairobi, Kenya – 100% Shareholding – Milling of maize and wheat for human consumption. Held through Unga Holdings Limited. 
 Unga Farm Care (East Africa) Limited – Nairobi, Kenya – 100% Shareholding – Manufacture of animal nutrition products and distribution of animal health products. Held through Unga Holdings Limited. 
 Unga Millers (U) Limited – Kampala, Uganda – 100% Shareholding – Milling of maize and wheat for human consumption and the distribution of animal health products.  Held through Unga Holdings Limited.
 Ennsvalley Bakery Limited – Nairobi, Kenya – 52% Shareholding – Baking and sale of cakes, bread and pastries. Held through Unga Holdings Limited.

Shareholding 
The shares of the stock of Unga Group Limited are traded on the main market segment of the Nairobi Securities Exchange, under the symbol: UNGA. , the shareholding in the group's stock was as depicted in the table below:

The group's largest shareholder, Victus Limited, is associated with First Chartered Securities. A Kenyan investment company with interest in real estate, banking, farming and insurance.

Governance 
Unga Group is governed by a nine-person board of directors with Isabella Ochola-Wilson serving as the chairperson and Nicholas Hutchinson  as the chief executive officer.

References

External links
Unga Group at myStocks KE
Unga Group at Stockskenya

Companies listed on the Nairobi Securities Exchange
Manufacturing companies based in Nairobi
1908 establishments in the East Africa Protectorate